Furze Down School is a co-educational special education school in Winslow, Buckinghamshire. It is a community school, which takes children from the age of 2 through to the age of 19. The school has approximately 177 pupils.

The school caters for children with a range of special educational needs, including learning difficulties, autism, behavioural, social and emotional difficulties, and language and communication difficulties.

The school was rebuilt in 2011.

The school's most recent Ofsted inspection in November 2018 judged it to be "Outstanding".

References

External links
School Website
School VLE
Ofsted Reports
Department for Education Performance Tables 2011

Schools for people on the autistic spectrum
Special schools in Buckinghamshire
Winslow, Buckinghamshire
Community schools in Buckinghamshire